Vizić is a village located in the Bačka Palanka municipality, in the South Bačka District of Serbia, although it is not geographically located in Bačka, but in Syrmia. The village is situated in the Autonomous Province of Vojvodina. The population of Vizić numbering 349 people (2002 census), of whom 323 are ethnic Serbs.

Historical Populations

1961: 396
1971: 421
1981: 428
1991: 392
2002: 349

References
Slobodan Ćurčić, Broj stanovnika Vojvodine, Novi Sad, 1996.

See also
List of places in Serbia
List of cities, towns and villages in Vojvodina

Bačka Palanka
Populated places in Syrmia
South Bačka District